Kalinga is a 1980 Indian Kannada-language film, directed by V. Somashekhar and produced by Srikanth Nahatha. The film stars Vishnuvardhan, Rati Agnihotri, Udaykumar and Vajramuni. The film has musical score by Chellapilla Satyam. The movie is a remake of the 1976 Hindi movie Kalicharan.

Cast

Vishnuvardhan
Rati Agnihotri
Udaykumar
Vajramuni
Dinesh
Thoogudeepa Srinivas
Shakti Prasad
Tiger Prabhakar
Sampath
Geetha
B. Jayashree
Rajeshwari
Baby Rekha
Baby Lakshmi
Jyothilakshmi
Hanumanthachar
Shivaprakash
Ashwath Narayana

Soundtrack
The music was composed by Satyam.

References

External links
 
 

1980 films
1980s Kannada-language films
Films scored by Satyam (composer)
Kannada remakes of Hindi films
Films directed by V. Somashekhar